The 1824 United States presidential election in Maine took place between October 26 and December 2, 1824, as part of the 1824 United States presidential election. Voters chose nine representatives, or electors to the Electoral College, who voted for president and vice president.

During this election, the Democratic-Republican Party was the only major national party, and four different candidates from this party sought the presidency. Maine voted for John Quincy Adams over William H. Crawford. Adams won Maine by a margin of 63.0%.

Results

See also
 United States presidential elections in Maine

Notes

References

Maine
1824
1824 Maine elections